was a town located in Shimoge District, Ōita Prefecture, Japan.

As of 2003, the town had an estimated population of 3,721 and the density of 43.54 persons per km2. The total area was 85.46 km2.

On March 1, 2005, Hon'yabakei, along with the towns of Yabakei and Yamakuni, and the village of Sankō (all from Shimoge District), was merged into the expanded city of Nakatsu.

Dissolved municipalities of Ōita Prefecture